The halszither (German for "neck zither" or "neck cittern") is a stringed instrument from Switzerland. It has nine steel strings in five courses and is tuned: G2, D3 D3, G3 G3, B3 B3, D4 D4.

See also
Cittern
Waldzither
Portuguese guitar
English guitar

References
 The Stringed Instrument Database
 Halszither.ch
 ATLAS of Plucked Instruments

Mandolin family instruments
Swiss musical instruments